René Cournoyer (born April 23, 1997) is a Canadian artistic gymnast, who has competed internationally since 2014.

Career
At the 2014 Pan American Youth Gymnastics Championships, Cournoyer qualified for the 2014 Summer Youth Olympics in Nanjing, China. At the games, Cournoyer finished in 19th in the all-around, 6th in the vault and 7th in the horizontal bar.

Cournoyer was named to his first senior national team for the 2015 Pan American Games in Toronto.

At the 2018 Commonwealth Games in Gold Coast, Australia, Cournoyer was part of the silver medal winning team, along with three fourth place finishes in the individual finals (rings, vault and parallel bars).

At the 2019 Pan American Games in Lima, Peru, Cournoyer won bronze in the team event, while finishing fourth in the individual all-around.

At the 2019 World Artistic Gymnastics Championships, Cournoyer finished in 43rd in the individual all around, which was high enough to qualify him for the 2020 Summer Olympics in Tokyo, Japan. Cournoyer was officially named to Canada's 2020 Olympic team on June 17, 2021.

References

1997 births
Canadian male artistic gymnasts
Living people
Gymnasts at the 2014 Summer Youth Olympics
Gymnasts at the 2015 Pan American Games
Gymnasts at the 2018 Commonwealth Games
Commonwealth Games medallists in gymnastics
Commonwealth Games silver medallists for Canada
Gymnasts at the 2019 Pan American Games
Pan American Games bronze medalists for Canada
Pan American Games medalists in gymnastics
Medalists at the 2019 Pan American Games
People from Repentigny, Quebec
Gymnasts at the 2020 Summer Olympics
Olympic gymnasts of Canada
20th-century Canadian people
21st-century Canadian people
Medallists at the 2018 Commonwealth Games